The Basic People's Congress, or Fundamental Popular Council, was the smallest unit of government in Muammar Gaddafi's Libya. It governed the equivalent of a municipality, and that geographic district was also called a Basic People's Congress.

The congress consisted of every man and woman who had attained the age of majority. The actual congress met at three scheduled meetings per year or as called upon by necessity. The first meeting was usually devoted to a detailed agenda for the next two meetings. At the second meeting the Basic People's Congress discussed issues relating to the local business, while at the third meeting seats on committees were filled, representatives elected and policy at the national and international level were discussed. Day-to-day management and oversight was provided by the people's committee appointed by the congress. The next political level up was the district congresses and then above that was the General People's Congress at the top.

Notes

See also
 Folkmoot
 Libyan Arab Jamahiriya

Government of Libya
History of Libya under Muammar Gaddafi
Political history of Libya